Star Trek: Phoenix is a Star Trek fan-created anthology series produced and filmed by Temporal Studios. The series was created by Leo Roberts and later developed by Leo Roberts, Jön Johnson and Star Trek author, Jeff Ayers.  The story is set 42 years after Star Trek: Nemesis in the prime universe created by Gene Roddenberry and follows the crew of the Federation's first political flagship, the Ascension-Class starship USS Phoenix (NCX-101138).

Along with an all-volunteer cast/crew production, several veterans of Star Trek including Academy Award-winning crew members from the J. J. Abrams reboot Star Trek and Star Trek: Into Darkness films worked on the project.

"Cloak & Dagger, Part One" was an official selection of the 2010 edition of the Maelstrom International Fantastic Film Festival in Seattle, Washington.

Cast and crew

Regular characters

Secondary characters

Plot

Part I 
After their diplomatic envoy crashes on the remote planet of Katrassii Prime, Captain Avari and the crew of the USS Phoenix embark on a dangerous mission to rescue them. Upon arrival in the Neutral Zone, the rescue team faces a labyrinth of mysteries while their true enemy lurks in the shadows. The crew of the Phoenix will sail into the unknown as the architect of their destruction leads them back to the beginning of their maiden voyage.

Sequel 
On October 23, 2015, Temporal Studios announced it was planning on producing Part II of "Cloak & Dagger" as a 90-minute audio drama to be released in mid-2016 in time for the franchise's 50th anniversary.  The script was being written by creator/executive producer, Leo Roberts and the majority of the cast from Part I was returning to reprise their respective roles.

On January 1, 2016, the studio announced Part II was on "indefinite hold" due to the Star Trek: Axanar lawsuit filed on December 29, 2015 by Paramount Pictures and CBS.

On May 20, 2016, at the Star Trek fan event in Los Angeles, executive producer, J. J. Abrams and Star Trek Beyond director, Justin Lin announced the lawsuit against Axanar was being dropped.  Official confirmation is pending and guidelines were being issued to fan productions but little information is currently available.

References

External links
 Star Trek: Phoenix official website
 Star Trek: Phoenix YouTube channel

Phoenix
American science fiction films
Star Trek web series